The Lushi (Grand History), formerly known as the Lopi, is an unofficial history of China written by Southern Song Dynasty scholar Luo Mi or Luo Bi (1131 – c. 1189), with key assistance from his son Luo Ping. As Lushi mixes historical facts with legends and folklore, its reliability has been disputed by historians. However, it is a valuable work for the study of ancient Chinese mythology. The extant version of Lushi was assembled by the later scholars based on Luo's work.

Notes

References

Song dynasty literature
12th-century Chinese books